The canton of Deux Rivières et Vallées is an administrative division of the Haute-Loire department, south-central France. It was created at the French canton reorganisation which came into effect in March 2015. Its seat is in Sainte-Sigolène.

It consists of the following communes:
Saint-Didier-en-Velay
Sainte-Sigolène
Saint-Pal-de-Mons
Saint-Victor-Malescours
La Séauve-sur-Semène

References

Cantons of Haute-Loire